Good Morning Britain was TV-am's main breakfast television show, broadcast on weekdays from February 1983 until the franchise ended in 1992. It had many different presenters throughout its run.

After a difficult first few months, which almost led to the failure of the broadcasting franchise, Good Morning Britain became a success.

The studio buildings in Hawley Crescent would later be acquired by what is now Paramount Global, and ultimately used as Paramount International Networks' offices.

According to Kaleidoscope's TV Brain website, many editions of the original Good Morning Britain, right up to its end, no longer exist in the archives.

Overview
Good Morning Britain had a mixture of news and current affairs, weather, cartoons, music, and many popular guests of the time. It also featured a popular exercise section, hosted in the early days by Michael Van Straten and Jackie Genova, and then more famously by "Mad Lizzie" Webb. The news was provided in-house by TV-am, but following its loss of the licence the news provision was contracted out to Sky News from 1 February to 31 December 1992.

At its peak, the programme would feature large outside broadcasts throughout the European winter/Australian summer from Bondi Beach in Australia, renaming the show G'Day Britain.

Other presenters of the show included Chris Tarrant, Anneka Rice, Richard Keys, Kathy Tayler, Lorraine Kelly, Jayne Irving and Dynasty star Gordon Thomson.

Initially, David Frost, Anna Ford, Michael Parkinson, Angela Rippon and Robert Kee were the presenters and main shareholders of the station, but the original format was soon dropped, and all bar Frost left the broadcaster.

Weekday schedule for presenting

Weekend schedule for presenting

References

External links
TV-am.org.uk – The TV-am Television Archives (1983–1992)

1983 British television series debuts
1992 British television series endings
TV-am original programming
English-language television shows
Breakfast television in the United Kingdom